Palazzo Pesaro may refer to any one of a number of Venetian palaces of the Pesaro family:

 Ca' Pesaro, on the Grand Canal in the sestiere of Santa Croce
 The Fondaco dei Turchi, on the Grand Canal in the sestiere of Santa Croce
 Palazzo Pesaro Orfei, in the sestiere of San Marco
 Palazzo Pesaro Papafava, in the sestiere of Cannaregio
 Palazzo Ravà, on the Grand Canal in the sestiere of San Polo